Naing Ko Ko (born 5 July 1980) is a Burmese politician who currently serves as a House of Nationalities member of parliament for Kachin State № 12 Constituency. He is a member of the National League for Democracy.

Early life and education 
Naing Ko Ko was born in Shwegu Township, Kachin State on 5 July 1980. He graduated M.P. from Government Technical Institute, Monywa and B.Sc (Chemistry) from Shwebo University. His former job was Water industry.

Political career
He is a member of the National League for Democracy Party, he was elected as an Amyotha Hluttaw MP, winning a majority of 31058 votes and elected representative from kachin State No. 12 parliamentary constituency.

References

National League for Democracy politicians
1980 births
Living people
People from Kachin State
Members of the House of Nationalities